The Journey is the fifth album by contemporary Christian pop trio, Sierra.

Reception
Ashleigh Kittle of AllMusic reviewed the album and said it is "carefully crafted and beautifully arranged." A Billboard Magazine review stated "The quality of the material and the performances make this a journey well worth taking", and named "Carry Me" a gorgeous number.

Track listing

Track information and credits taken from the album's liner notes.

Personnel

"I Will Exhalt the One"
 Keyboards – Byron Hagan
 Acoustic Guitar – Tom Hemby
 Electric Guitar – Glenn Pearce
 Bass – Mark Hill
 Drums & Percussion – Scott Williamson

"Carry Me"
 Keyboard programming – Brian Green
 Acoustic Guitar – Tom Hemby
 Mandolin – Tom Hemby
 Electric Guitar – Jerry McPherson
 Bass – Mark Hill
 Drums – Steve Brewster
 Piccolo – Jennifer Hendrix
 Violin – David Davidson
 Choir – Deborah Schnelle, Lisa Merrell, Joslyn Tredway, Garry Kean, Darren Scott, Seth Fickett, Stacey Wilbur

"That's What I Know"
 Keyboards – Byron Hagan
 Acoustic Guitar – Tom Hemby
 Electric Guitar – Glenn Pearce
 Bass – Mark Hill
 Drums & Percussion – Scott Williamson

"Your Love"
 Keyboards – Byron Hagan
 Electric Guitar – Glenn Pearce
 Bass – Mark Hill
 Drums & Percussion – Scott Williamson

"I Believe"
 Keyboards – Byron Hagan
 Acoustic Guitar – Tom Hemby
 Electric Guitar – Glenn Pearce
 Bass – Mark Hill
 Drums & Percussion – Scott Williamson

"Open Arms of Love"
 Keyboard programming – Brian Green
 Piano – Brian Green
 Acoustic Guitar – Tom Hemby
 Electric Guitar – Jerry McPherson
 Bass – Mark Hill
 Drums – Steve Brewster
 Scripture Reading – Cooper Green

"The Journey"
 Keyboards – Byron Hagan
 Acoustic Guitar – Tom Hemby
 Electric Guitar – Glenn Pearce
 Bass – Mark Hill
 Drums & Percussion – Scott Williamson

"All That You Are"
 Keyboard programming – Brian Green
 Accordion – Brian Green
 Acoustic Guitar – Tom Hemby
 Electric Guitar – Jerry McPherson
 Bass – Mark Hill
 Drums – Steve Brewster

"I See"
 Keyboard programming – Brian Green
 Piano – Brian Green
 Acoustic Guitar – Tom Hemby
 Electric Guitar – Jerry McPherson
 Bass – Mark Hill
 Drums – Steve Brewster
 Violin – David Davidson, Conni Ellisor
 Cello – John Catchings
 String Arrangements – Brian Green

"The Rest of My Life"
 Keyboard programming – Brian Green
 Piano – Brian Green
 Hammond B-3 – Brian Green
 Acoustic Guitar – Tom Hemby
 Electric Guitar – Jerry McPherson
 Bass – Mark Hill
 Drums – Steve Brewster
 Choir – Deborah Schnelle, Lisa Merrell, Joslyn Tredway, Garry Kean, Darren Scott, Seth Fickett, Stacey Wilbur

References

2001 albums
Contemporary Christian music albums by American artists
Pamplin Music albums